Bientie is a surname. Notable people with the surname include:

 Anne-Grethe Leine Bientie (born 1954), Norwegian writer and psalmist
  (born 1951), Norwegian priest and editor of Daerpies Dierie

See also
 Bienias